Gareth Jamie Bevan is a Welsh language campaigner from Merthyr Tydfil, Wales and a prominent member of Cymdeithas yr Iaith Gymraeg. Bevan refused to pay fines and costs to Merthyr Tydfil Magistrate's Court for breaking into Conservative Party offices in north Cardiff the day before a visit from David Cameron in a demonstration against cuts to S4C.

Bevan was sentenced to 35 days in prison by Merthyr Tydfil magistrates in 2012. He has said that he is using the case to draw attention to the lack of Welsh language correspondence from the courts.

He had complained three times about a monolingual English correspondence from the courts service but later received a court summons in English only.

Music
Bevan is also a Welsh folk singer-songwriter, performing solo and with bands Y Betti Galws and Jamie Bevan a’r Gweddillion. He has performed alongside Welsh language folk stalwarts Meic Stevens and Dafydd Iwan and his music has been played on BBC Radio Wales, Radio Cymru and S4C. He has performed live  at the National Eisteddfod of Wales and at  Welsh language, republican and other political benefit gigs, together with regular appearances at Red Poets events alongside poet Mike Jenkins and others.

Discography
Y Betti Galws - Self-titled, (2009) CD.
Jamie Bevan a’r Gweddillion - Torri'r Cerffiw, (2011) CD
Jamie Bevan a’r Gweddillion - Ei Fab aeth o'i Flaen (Sain), (2012) Download.
Jamie Bevan a’r Gweddillion - Bach Yn Ryff, (2013) CD.

References

Living people
Welsh activists
Welsh language activists
Welsh republicans
People from Merthyr Tydfil
Year of birth missing (living people)